The United States Penitentiary, Lompoc (USP Lompoc) is a medium-security United States federal prison for male inmates in Lompoc, California. It is part of the Lompoc Federal Correctional Complex (FCC Lompoc) and is operated by the Federal Bureau of Prisons, a division of the United States Department of Justice. The facility also has a satellite prison camp for minimum-security male inmates. It was formerly a military disciplinary barracks on Camp Cooke.

The complex also includes a Federal Correctional Institution and a minimum-security prison camp.

Facility
The USP (Medium) security facility also contains a High security wing constructed in 2006 known as the "SHU" or "Special Housing Unit". Inmates may be placed in the SHU as a disciplinary measure or for administrative reasons.

The FCI (Low) has a Residential Drug Abuse Program (RDAP)

There are two minimum security prison camps that also house adult male inmates.

Notable inmates
Inmates released from custody prior to 1982 are not listed on the Federal Bureau of Prisons website.

Current

Former

COVID-19 pandemic

A deadly COVID-19 outbreak swept through the federal correctional complex in 2020. It included several dozen staff members, including correctional officers.

See also

 List of U.S. federal prisons
 Federal Bureau of Prisons
 Incarceration in the United States

References

Buildings and structures in Santa Barbara County, California
Lompoc, California
Prisons in California
Lompoc